Pandoraea pnomenusa is a Gram-negative bacterium of the genus Pandoraea.

References

External links
Type strain of Pandoraea pnomenusa at BacDive -  the Bacterial Diversity Metadatabase

Burkholderiaceae